North Carolina Highway 150 (NC 150) is a primary state highway in the U.S. state of North Carolina.  It serves the Foothills and Piedmont Triad areas of the state, connecting the cities of Shelby, Mooresville, Salisbury and Winston-Salem.

Route description

Gaston and Cleveland counties 
In Gaston County, NC 150 downgrades to a street. It travels through central Cherryville, North Carolina, where it meets NC 274. After crossing into Cleveland County, the route travels through Waco and across a small part of Kings Mountain Reservoir. Shortly after crossing NC 180, NC 150 enters Shelby, where it joins US 74 Business westbound. In downtown, NC 150 switches roads to share NC 18 south out of town. Two miles after crossing the mainline US 74, NC 150 and NC 18 split. NC 150 heads due west to Boiling Springs, where the route turns due south across the Broad River to end at the South Carolina state line. SC 150 continues south across the line toward I-85 again and Gaffney, South Carolina.

Catawba and Lincoln counties 
After crossing a couple of bridges across Lake Norman, Marshall Steam Station is visible on the right. NC 150 continues past the power plant through the lake-oriented communities of Terrell and Sherrills Ford, crossing over numerous tributaries of the lake/Catawba River. Shortly after meeting NC 16 at a four-way intersection, NC 150 crosses into Lincoln County. In Lincolnton, NC 150 and NC 27 join for a  segment through a commercial district, splitting shortly after an interchange with the US 321 freeway. Through the entire NC 27 concurrency, NC 150 is also concurrent with North Carolina Bicycle Route 6. NC 150 continues southward, along with NC 155 and the business route of US 321, after the split east of downtown. Shortly outside the town, NC 150 splits from NC 155 and heads in a southwestly direction through Crouse and across the county line where NC 150 becomes an expressway.

Rowan and Iredell counties 
Continuing on westbound NC 150, the route crosses the Yadkin into Rowan County along with US 29/70 on Wil-Cox Bridge while a new bridge is built. The three conjoined highways continue together through downtown Spencer, passing Spencer Shops, and split in downtown Salisbury. NC 150 heads due west once again toward Mooresville, crossing into Iredell County.

Just outside Mooresville, NC 150 joins NC 152 for a short  concurrency before splitting on a northern bypass route (Oak Ridge Farm Highway), skipping downtown Mooresville. After crossing NC 801 and NC 115, the highway enters a dense commercial shopping area along Plaza Drive. This stretch of road has witnessed massive growth in the early 2000s (decade) with the construction of numerous big box stores as a result of the growing popularity of nearby Lake Norman and the local NASCAR racing culture. As a consequence, NC 150 through western Mooresville was widened to a 4-lane boulevard in the early 2000s (decade). This developed area continues past NC 150's interchanges with US 21 and I-77. A few miles after crossing the Interstate, NC 150 returns to a two-lane road known as River Highway. The route enters the Lake Norman area, passing many businesses tailored to tourists, fishermen, and boating enthusiasts, before actually crossing the lake into Catawba County.

Davidson County
At I-85, NC 150's routing used to be quite unusual. Before the reconstruction of the I-85 through the area, the westbound NC 150 roadway merged onto I-85 southbound lanes and the routes were concurrent for about  before NC 150 left-exited with US 29/70 southward. Northbound US 29/70 and eastbound NC 150 entered I-85 northbound on the left and the NC 150 exit ramp was immediately on the right. Since it was nearly impossible for one traveling on NC 150 northbound to exit there, motorists were directed to the next exit, Clark Road, which returned to the main roadway using  signs. In the late 2000s, I-85 received a new Yadkin River crossing, which also eliminated the awkward left exit and entrance for NC 150 and US 29/70. NC 150 is no longer concurrent with I-85, but instead follows US 29/70 on a new parallel road down to the Yadkin River crossing. Near the Churchland community, NC 150 takes an odd turn east, despite being signed west, toward I-85/US 29/70/52 to avoid crossing the Yadkin River. The highway passes through an interchange with US 64 and continues into the communities of Reeds and Tyro. NC 150 becomes a two-lane road again as the highway continues southward (signed west) through the community of Arcadia.

Forsyth County

NC 150 enters the city of Winston-Salem at this point. It passes a trumpet interchange with Interstate 40 and Silas Creek Parkway  (NC-67) at an at-grade junction. It enters a commercially developed area near downtown Winston-Salem, before it leaves Peters Creek Parkway at a folded-diamond interchange with U.S. 421, which uses the road name Salem Parkway, using a controlled-access grade after over a mile. After its concurrency with U.S. 421 for nearly twelve miles, it leaves U.S. 421 at an interchange with Macy Grove Road. It passes a one quadrant interchange with Mountain Street before entering a residential area with superstreets. NC 150 leaves Macy Grove Road at an intersection with Main Street shortly before entering Oak Ridge.

Caswell, Rockingham, and Guilford counties
NC 150 travels west from its eastern terminus at U.S. Route 158 (US 158) in rural Caswell County on a winding two-lane road into Rockingham County. Shortly after crossing the county line, NC 150 has a short  concurrency with NC 87 through the unincorporated community of Williamsburg. NC 150 exits the concurrency to the south, crossing into Guilford County shortly thereafter. As It enters Osceola, it turns right at a junction with NC 61, which has its northern terminus here. NC 150, remaining a two-lane route, continues westward again, through the small community of Monticello, before coming to an interchange with Future Interstate 785 (I-785) and US 29.

Slowing to a  speed limit after the interchange, NC 150 progresses towards Browns Summit, the first of three northern Greensboro suburbs the route passes through. After passing through a small road kink at a railroad crossing in the middle of Browns Summit, the route makes its way entirely across the rural community, thereby effectively bypassing Greensboro and remaining north of the county. As NC 150 approaches Summerfield (another suburb), numerous housing developments can be seen on either side of the road. NC 150 enters Summerfield's commercial district, at the US 220 and Auburn Road junction, where a handful of shopping centers can be found, and then turns right and shares a short  concurrency with US 220 northbound. Continuing west again with the name "Oak Ridge Road", NC 150 encounters an interchange with Interstate 73. After that, NC 150 enters the final Greensboro suburb of Oak Ridge, where it passes by the Oak Ridge Military Academy at its intersection with NC 68. NC 150 continues on a southwest course out of Oak Ridge and Guilford County.

hange with I-40. NC 150 continues in a southbound direction, despite the route's east–west orientation, into Davidson County.

History
NC 150 was designated around 1929 as a spur route from the first NC 15, which is now mostly part of US 29. Its first routing ran west from Salisbury to Mooresville. By 1931, the route was extended through Lincolnton to US 74 in Shelby. The highway previously linking Lincolnton and Shelby was designated as NC 206.

NC 150's massive extension east occurred in late 1939 or 1940, giving the route its current eastern terminus at US 158 and western terminus at the South Carolina state line. It was partially cosigned in parts with US 29/70/52, US 74, NC 18, and old alignment of NC 184.

NC 150 underwent numerous realignments in the 1940s and 1950s in Winston-Salem with the construction of the new "parkways" (Silas Creek Parkway, Peters Creek Parkway, Corporation Parkway). Its alignment change in Kernersville, along with its extension along Peters Creek Parkway, occurred in 1994. NC 150 was rerouted onto a bypass in Kernersville again in 2020.
The segment of NC 150 through Mooresville was replaced with a northern bypass route in the late 1950s. In the 2000s (decade), NC 150 through Mooresville was widened to a four-lane boulevard, as was southern Peters Creek Parkway in southern Winston-Salem.

NC 150, once signed as North and South, was converted in 1982 to its current East and West signage and description.

Junction list

Special routes

Lincolnton alternate route

North Carolina Highway 150A (NC 150A) was established in 1956 when NC 150 was rerouted onto new primary routing bypassing southeast of downtown Lincolnton; the old alignment became NC 150A.  The route followed West Highway 150 to Riverside Drive, where it linked-up with NC 27.  In concurrency, it goes through downtown area via Main Street and Court Square Drive before linking back with NC 150 at Generals Boulevard.  In 1960, NC 150A was decommissioned, leaving NC 27 through most of it and downgrade for West Highway 150 (SR 1407).

Mooresville alternate route

North Carolina Highway 150A (NC 150A) was established between 1950 and 1953 as a renumbering of NC 150 along McLand Street and Main Street through downtown Mooresville.  Around 1955, NC 150 was completely removed from the downtown area and NC 150A was renumbered as NC 152.

References

External links

 
 NCRoads.com: N.C. 150
 NCRoads.com: N.C. 150-A

150
Transportation in Cleveland County, North Carolina
Transportation in Gaston County, North Carolina
Transportation in Lincoln County, North Carolina
Transportation in Catawba County, North Carolina
Transportation in Iredell County, North Carolina
Transportation in Rowan County, North Carolina
Transportation in Davidson County, North Carolina
Transportation in Forsyth County, North Carolina
Transportation in Guilford County, North Carolina
Transportation in Rockingham County, North Carolina
Transportation in Caswell County, North Carolina